Berber Kamstra (born 1 April 1960 in Zaandijk) is a Dutch former freestyle swimmer who competed at the 1976 Summer Olympics in Montreal, Quebec, Canada. She was eliminated in the preliminary heats of the 100 metre freestyle.

References

1960 births
Living people
Dutch female freestyle swimmers
Olympic swimmers of the Netherlands
Swimmers at the 1976 Summer Olympics
Sportspeople from Zaanstad
20th-century Dutch women
21st-century Dutch women